CuPy is an open source library for GPU-accelerated computing with Python programming language, providing support for multi-dimensional arrays, sparse matrices, and a variety of numerical algorithms implemented on top of them.
CuPy shares the same API set as NumPy and SciPy, allowing it to be a drop-in replacement to run NumPy/SciPy code on GPU. CuPy supports NVIDIA CUDA GPU platform, and AMD ROCm GPU platform starting in v9.0.

CuPy has been initially developed as a backend of Chainer deep learning framework, and later established as an independent project in 2017.

CuPy is a part of the NumPy ecosystem array libraries and is widely adopted to utilize GPU with Python, especially in high-performance computing environments such as Summit, Perlmutter, EULER, and ABCI.

CuPy is a NumFOCUS affiliated project.

Features 

CuPy implements NumPy/SciPy-compatible APIs, as well as features to write user-defined GPU kernels or access low-level APIs.

NumPy-compatible APIs 

The same set of APIs defined in the NumPy package are available under  package.

 Multi-dimensional array for boolean, integer, float, and complex data types
 Module-level functions
 Linear algebra functions
 Fast Fourier transform
 Random number generator

SciPy-compatible APIs 

The same set of APIs defined in the SciPy package are available under  package.

 Sparse matrices of CSR, COO, CSC, and DIA format
 Discrete Fourier transform
 Advanced linear algebra
 Multidimensional image processing
 Sparse linear algebra
 Special functions
 Signal processing
 Statistical functions

User-defined GPU kernels 

 Kernel templates for element-wise and reduction operations
 Raw kernel (CUDA C/C++)
 Just-in-time transpiler (JIT)
 Kernel fusion

Distributed computing 

 Distributed communication package, providing collective and peer-to-peer primitives

Low-level CUDA features 

 Stream and event
 Memory pool
 Profiler
 Host API binding
 CUDA Python support

Interoperability 

 DLPack
 CUDA Array Interface
 NEP 13
 NEP 18
 Array API Standard

Examples

Array creation 
>>> import cupy as cp
>>> x = cp.array([1, 2, 3])
>>> x
array([1, 2, 3])
>>> y = cp.arange(10)
>>> y
array([0, 1, 2, 3, 4, 5, 6, 7, 8, 9])

Basic operations 
>>> import cupy as cp
>>> x = cp.arange(12).reshape(3, 4).astype(cp.float32)
>>> x
array([[ 0.,  1.,  2.,  3.],
       [ 4.,  5.,  6.,  7.],
       [ 8.,  9., 10., 11.]], dtype=float32)
>>> x.sum(axis=1)
array([ 6., 22., 38.], dtype=float32)

Raw CUDA C/C++ kernel 
>>> import cupy as cp
>>> kern = cp.RawKernel(r'''
... extern "C" __global__
... void multiply_elemwise(const float* in1, const float* in2, float* out) {
...     int tid = blockDim.x * blockIdx.x + threadIdx.x;
...     out[tid] = in1[tid] * in2[tid];
... }
... ''', 'multiply_elemwise')
>>> in1 = cp.arange(16, dtype=cp.float32).reshape(4, 4)
>>> in2 = cp.arange(16, dtype=cp.float32).reshape(4, 4)
>>> out = cp.zeros((4, 4), dtype=cp.float32)
>>> kern((4,), (4,), (in1, in2, out))  # grid, block and arguments
>>> out
array([[  0.,   1.,   4.,   9.],
       [ 16.,  25.,  36.,  49.],
       [ 64.,  81., 100., 121.],
       [144., 169., 196., 225.]], dtype=float32)

Applications 

 spaCy
 XGBoost
 turboSETI (Berkeley SETI)
 NVIDIA RAPIDS
 einops
 Chainer

See also 

 Array programming
 List of numerical-analysis software
 Dask

References

External links 
 
 GitHub repository

Array programming languages
Articles with example Python (programming language) code
Free mathematics software
Free science software
Numerical analysis software for Linux
Numerical analysis software for Windows
Numerical programming languages
Python (programming language) scientific libraries
Software using the MIT license